The 1929 Detroit City College Tartars football team represented Detroit City College (later renamed Wayne State University) in the Michigan Collegiate Conference during the 1929 college football season. In its first season under head coach Norman G. Wann, the team compiled a 2–7 record.

Schedule

References

Detroit City College
Wayne State Warriors football seasons
Detroit City College Tartars football